Blue Eyes is a 2009 Brazilian drama film directed by José Joffily and starring David Rasche, Irandhir Santos, Cristina Lago, Erica Gimpel, and Frank Grillo.

Premise 
Not satisfied with the retirement and on his last day at the job, a U.S. immigration officer arbitrarily holds Latin American passengers inside a room of a New York airport. There he conducts interrogations that takes a surprising and tragic course.

Cast 
David Rasche as Marshall
Irandhir Santos as Nonato
Cristina Lago as Bia
Frank Grillo as Bob Estevez
Erica Gimpel as Sandra
Hector Bordoni as Augustín
Valeria Lorca as Assumpta
Branca Messina as Calypso
Everaldo Pontes as Bia's grandfather
Pablo Uranga as Martín

References

External links
  
 

2009 films
2000s Portuguese-language films
2000s English-language films
Brazilian drama films
Films shot in Recife
Films about immigration to the United States
2009 drama films
2009 multilingual films
Brazilian multilingual films